The Nedbank Cup is a South African club football (soccer) tournament. The knockout tournament, based on the English FA Cup format, was one of a weak opponent facing a stronger one. The competition was sponsored by ABSA until 2007, after which Nedbank took over sponsorship.

The winner of the 2013–14 Nedbank Cup qualified for the 2015 CAF Confederation Cup.

Format
The 16 Premier Soccer League clubs, 8 National First Division teams, as well as 8 teams from the amateur ranks compete for the title. The winner also qualifies for the CAF Confederation Cup.

The teams are not seeded at any stage, and the first 16 sides drawn out of the hat receive a home-ground advantage. There are no longer any replays in the tournament, and any games which end in a draw after 90 minutes are subject to 30 minutes extra time followed by penalties if necessary.

Results

Preliminary round

First round

Second round

Quarter-finals

Semi-finals

Final

External links
Nedbank Cup Official Website
South Africa 2013/14 at Rec.Sports.Soccer Statistics Foundation

Notes and references

2014–15 domestic association football cups
2013–14 in South African soccer
2013-14